William Wilson Anderson (September 17, 1891 – September 17, 1969) was an American football, basketball, and baseball coach. He served as the head football coach at Occidental College from 1932 to 1939. Anderson played college football at the University of Illinois from 1915 to 1916 under head coach Robert Zuppke. Anderson was born in Ohio, Illinois.  He died on September 17, 1969, at the age of 77.

Head coaching record

Football

References

External links
 Occidental Hall of Fame profile
 

1891 births
1969 deaths
American football halfbacks
Illinois Fighting Illini football players
Occidental Tigers athletic directors
Occidental Tigers baseball coaches
Occidental Tigers football coaches
Occidental Tigers men's basketball coaches
People from Bureau County, Illinois